Antonio Hall (born March 28, 1982) is a former Canadian football offensive tackle. He was signed by the Indianapolis Colts as an undrafted free agent in 2004. He played college football at Kentucky, starting in 45 consecutive games. In high school he was a starter on the 1997 USA Today National Championship team at Canton McKinley High School in Canton, Ohio.

Hall was also a member of the Kentucky Horsemen, Calgary Stampeders, Saskatchewan Roughriders, and the Edmonton Eskimos. During 2016, he was an assistant varsity football coach at Glenoak High School in Canton, Ohio. In 2017 and 2018 he was a varsity coach at Canton McKinley High School in Canton, Ohio. In 2019 Hall was the Defensive Coordinator and Assistant Athletic Director at St. Thomas Aquinas High School in Louisville, Ohio. Currently he is the Athletic Director at Canton McKinley High School and the District Athletic Director for Canton City Schools.

External links
Just Sports Stats
Calgary Stampeders bio

1982 births
Living people
American football offensive linemen
American players of Canadian football
Calgary Stampeders players
Canadian football offensive linemen
Edmonton Elks players
Indianapolis Colts players
Kentucky Horsemen players
Kentucky Wildcats football players
Saskatchewan Roughriders players